Glenn L. Cowan (August 25, 1952 – April 6, 2004) was an American table tennis player.

Biography
Cowan was from New Rochelle, New York, and was Jewish. His parents were Phil (a television executive, who died at age 48) and Fran Cowan. The family later moved to Bel Air, California. He attended University High School.

In 1964 at age 12 he won the singles for his age under-13s group in the Eastern regional junior championships. Cowan won the 1967 U.S. Open junior under-17s table tennis championships. Two years later he won another U.S. Open.

One day during the 31st World Table Tennis Championship in Nagoya, Japan, American team member Cowan missed his own bus and in his haste got onto the bus of the Chinese team. Unlike his team mates, who ignored Cowan, Zhuang Zedong greeted him and presented him with a silk-screen portrait of the Huangshan Mountains, thus starting the so-called ping-pong diplomacy.

Cowan was arguably one of two critical personalities, the other being the Chinese table tennis player Zhuang Zedong, in the 1971 ping-pong diplomacy which served as a prelude to the normalization of the Sino-American relations. He was the youngest player on the first U.S. table tennis team to compete in 1971's “Ping-pong diplomacy” tour to China.

Cowan studied at UCLA and Santa Monica College (1969 to 1972). He became a junior high school teacher. He was diagnosed, variously, as being bipolar and schizophrenic. He was married briefly. He lived in Culver City.

He died in 2004 at 51 years of age. He had been hospitalized for psychiatric treatment and underwent a bypass surgery. During the surgery, he went into a coma and died of a heart attack.

Zhuang Zedong called from Beijing to express his sympathy, and in 2007 visited the United States, and met Cowan's mother. He called never seeing Cowan again the greatest "regret of my life."

Accolades
In 2008 he was inducted into the Southern California Jewish Sports Hall of Fame. He was posthumously inducted into the California Table Tennis Hall of Fame in 2014.

References

External links
CNN: 'The ping heard round the world Revisited'

American male table tennis players
1951 births
2004 deaths
People from Culver City, California
Sportspeople from New Rochelle, New York
Santa Monica College alumni
University of California, Los Angeles alumni
American people of Jewish descent